Lafayette Methodist Church is a historic church off SR 107 in LaFayette, Kentucky, United States.

It was built in 1852 by Dutch-born builder Daniel Umbenhour (1816–1886), and added to the National Register of Historic Places in 1979.  It contains Greek Revival elements and an unusual belfry.

References

Methodist churches in Kentucky
Churches on the National Register of Historic Places in Kentucky
Churches completed in 1852
19th-century Methodist church buildings in the United States
Churches in Christian County, Kentucky
National Register of Historic Places in Christian County, Kentucky
1852 establishments in Kentucky
Greek Revival architecture in Kentucky